Campeonato Brasileiro, Portuguese for Brazilian Championship, may refer to:

Football
 Campeonato Brasileiro Série A, the top league of Brazilian football
 Campeonato Brasileiro Série B, the second division
 Campeonato Brasileiro Série C, the third division
 Campeonato Brasileiro Série D, the fourth division
 Campeonato Brasileiro Sub-20, the top under-20 league
 Campeonato Brasileiro de Seleções Estaduais, defunct competition played by state teams
 Campeonato Brasileiro de Futebol Feminino, the top league of women's football in Brazil
 Campeonato Brasileiro de Aspirantes, a Brazilian league for the top-tier clubs' under-23 squads

Other sports
 Campeonato Brasileiro de Beisebol, the main Brazilian baseball tournament
 Campeonato Brasileiro de Basquete, the main division of Brazilian basketball
 Campeonato Brasileiro de Stock Car, the main division of Brazilian national stock car championships, also known as Stock Car Brasil
 Campeonato Brasileiro de Rugby, the main division of Brazilian rugby union

See also
 Campeonato Brasileiro 1971 (disambiguation)
 Campeonato Brasileiro 2004 (disambiguation)
 Campeonato Brasileiro 2005 (disambiguation)
 Campeonato Brasileiro 2006 (disambiguation)
 Campeonato Brasileiro 2007 (disambiguation)
 Campeonato Brasileiro 2008 (disambiguation)